The Best Of N-Trance 1992-2002 is the greatest hits album released by the British electronic music group N-Trance.

Track listing

Personnel
Martin Ansell - Vocals
Vinny Burns - Guitar
Ricardo da Force - Rap
David Grant - Vocals
Lee Limer - Vocals
Kelly Llorenna - Vocals
Rachel McFarlane - Vocals
Sandy McLelland - Vocals
N-Trance, Dale Longworth, Kevin O'Toole - Main Performer, Producer
Nobby - Engineer
Rob Searle - Remixing, Producer, Mixing
Serano - Remixing, Producer
Jerome Stokes - Vocals, Background Vocals
Big Jim Sullivan - Producer, Mixing
Gillian Wisdom - Vocals
Viveen Wray - Vocals
Recording owned by All Around The World
Distributed by Universal
Marketed by Absolute Marketing and Distribution (AMD)

Release history

References 

2001 greatest hits albums
House music albums by English artists
N-Trance albums